GSEG Combined Cycle Power plant, Hazira is a gas based combined cycle power plant located at Hazira, Gujarat, in India. The project is a joint venture between Gujarat State Petroleum Corporation (GSPC) Ltd., GAIL, Krishak Bharati Cooperative (KRIBHCO)  and other Government of Gujarat Companies. Gujarat State Energy Generation Ltd. GSEG is a power company in Gujarat. It is a subsidiary of GSPC. The company is engaged in gas based generation of electricity.

The average natural gas requirement for the project is 0.78 Million cubic metres (MCM)/day which is sourced from gas exploration company GSPC and is transported by gas transportation company Gujarat State Petronet Limited.

Capacity

References

Electric-generation companies of India
Energy in Gujarat
Companies based in Ahmedabad
Natural gas-fired power stations in Gujarat
Surat district
2002 establishments in Gujarat
Energy infrastructure completed in 2002